Denis Gennadievich Tsygurov (February 26, 1971 – January 10, 2015) was a Russian professional ice hockey player.  Tsygurov was drafted in the second round, 38th overall, by the Buffalo Sabres in the 1993 NHL Entry Draft following two seasons with HC Lada Togliatti of the Russian Hockey Super League. Tsygurov came to North America the following year and played in 24 games with the Rochester Americans of the American Hockey League and four games for the Sabres during the 1993–94 season. He was the son of Gennady Tsygurov, who was an ice hockey defenceman and coach in Russia; elder brother  also played at a high level. 

Tsygurov returned to the Sabres during the 1994–95 season for four games before being involved in a blockbuster six-player deal with the Los Angeles Kings.  Tsygurov was sent to the Kings along with future Hockey Hall of Famer Grant Fuhr and defenceman Philippe Boucher for defencemen Alexei Zhitnik and Charlie Huddy and goaltender Robb Stauber.  Tsygurov went on to play in 39 games for the Kings over the next two seasons, amassing six points.

Following the 1995–96 season, Tsygurov returned to Europe, where except for a brief stint with the Long Beach Ice Dogs in 1997–98, he spent the last five years of his pro career.  Tsygurov's European stops included HC Opava in the Czech Extraliga, Kärpät in Finland's SM-liiga, CSK VVS Samara of the lower Russian league Vysshaya Liga, and HC Lada Togliatti and HC Neftekhimik Nizhnekamsk of the Russian Hockey Super League.

On January 10, 2015, Tsygurov died at the age of 43.

Career statistics

Regular season and playoffs

References

External links 
 

1971 births
Avangard Omsk players
Buffalo Sabres draft picks
Buffalo Sabres players
HC CSK VVS Samara players
HC Karlovy Vary players
HC Lada Togliatti players
HC Neftekhimik Nizhnekamsk players
Oulun Kärpät players
2015 deaths
Long Beach Ice Dogs (IHL) players
Los Angeles Kings players
Sportspeople from Chelyabinsk
Phoenix Roadrunners (IHL) players
Rochester Americans players
Russian ice hockey defencemen
Soviet ice hockey defencemen
Traktor Chelyabinsk players
Russian expatriate ice hockey people
Russian expatriate sportspeople in the United States
Russian expatriate sportspeople in the Czech Republic
Russian expatriate sportspeople in Finland
Expatriate ice hockey players in the United States
Expatriate ice hockey players in the Czech Republic
Expatriate ice hockey players in Finland